The 1974 American League Championship Series was a best-of-five matchup between the East Division Champion Baltimore Orioles and the West Division Champion Oakland Athletics. It was a rematch of the previous year's series and third overall between the two teams.

The A's beat the Orioles three games to one to win their third straight pennant, then defeated the Los Angeles Dodgers in the World Series for their third consecutive championship.

Summary

Baltimore Orioles vs. Oakland A's

Game summaries

Game 1

The Birds jumped all over the ace of the Oakland staff, Catfish Hunter, pounding him for six runs and eight hits, including three homers in less than five innings. Hunter had a skein of seven straight decisions over the Birds going into the game. Southpaw Mike Cuellar pitched steady ball for the winners and got the decision with relief help in the ninth inning from Ross Grimsley.

A portent of things to happen came in the first inning when Paul Blair, second man in the batting order, hit a Hunter pitch for a home run. Bert Campaneris' single that followed a fielder's choice and a stolen base by Bill North gave the A's a temporary tie in the third inning. But a double by Bobby Grich and Tommy Davis' single put the Orioles ahead to stay in the fourth. A four-run outburst in the fifth, featuring homers by Brooks Robinson and Bobby Grich, locked up the game and sent Hunter to the showers.

When Cuellar yielded a single to Jesús Alou and a double to Claudell Washington, both pinch-hitters, to open the last of the ninth, he was pulled in favor of Grimsley, who got the last three outs without trouble.

Game 2

The A's assumed command the next day when Ken Holtzman permitted the Orioles only five hits en route to a 5–0 triumph. The Oakland club got an unearned run in the fourth when Bobby Grich dropped a foul pop by Sal Bando for an error. Two pitches later, Bando drove a Dave McNally pitch over the left-field fence for a homer. Joe Rudi tripled home North in the sixth for the second run. In the eighth inning, with two men on—the result of a walk and an error—Ray Fosse hit a home run off reliever Grant Jackson to put the game on ice.

Game 3

In a great complete-game pitching battle between Vida Blue and Jim Palmer, Blue hurled a two-hitter and Palmer a four-hitter. But one of the four safe blows yielded by the Oriole right-hander was a home run by Sal Bando in the fourth inning, the only run of the game.

Game 4

The fourth game belonged to the A's, although their offense was able to produce only one safe hit for the afternoon. Cuellar pitched a no-hitter for 4⅔ innings, but walked four consecutive batters to give Oakland a run. During his stint on the mound, the Oriole lefty walked no less than nine batters and was removed while yet to give up a hit.

The run that was to prove decisive came in the seventh off reliever Ross Grimsley. Sal Bando walked and Reggie Jackson stroked a double off the left-field wall to plate Bando. The Orioles almost pulled the game out of the bag in their last turn at bat. With one out and Rollie Fingers pitching in relief of Hunter, Paul Blair walked and Bobby Grich singled. A force play provided the second out of the inning but Boog Powell's single drove in one run, finally ending a thirty-inning scoreless streak. Fingers, however, was equal to the occasion and fanned Don Baylor on a fast ball to clinch another league crown for Oakland.

Pitching dominated the four-game set, the A's batted a meager .183, but the Orioles were even lower at a paltry .177. After Game 1, superior Oakland pitching held Baltimore to just one run and twelve hits over the next three games, hitting a very weak .135 (12 for 89), with no extra-base hits.

Composite box
1974 ALCS (3–1): Oakland A's over Baltimore Orioles

References

External links
1974 ALCS at Baseball-Reference.com

American League Championship Series
American League Championship Series
Oakland Athletics postseason
Baltimore Orioles postseason
American League Championship Series
American League Championship Series
1970s in Baltimore
20th century in Oakland, California
American League Championship Series
Baseball competitions in Baltimore
Baseball competitions in Oakland, California